Barney in Concert is a Barney & the Backyard Gang stage show, taped at Majestic Theatre in Dallas, Texas on March 14, 1991, and released on video four months later on July 29, 1991. It also features the TV show Barney & Friends.

Music
An audio cassette version of Barney in Concert was released in 1992 with a purchase of a Time-Life Video release of a Barney video with a credit card. There were only two versions of the cassette made.

PBS Airing
In early 1993, PBS Kids aired the direct-to-video special as part of the Barney & Friends marathon to support and fund the show's second season.

Plot
The audience gets settled in before they hear a voice (Michael) saying the magic words, "Shimbaree, Shimbarah". Then, out of nowhere, sparkles start appearing onstage before Barney jumps out of the curtain, making his grand entrance, as the audience welcomes to his chubbier costume. He dances to his theme song, before he welcomes the audience. Then, he sings a song to tell them how excited he is to have them join him, and show them how special they are. Then, he decides to introduce them to the Backyard Gang. The curtain opens to a set with all sorts of gift boxes everywhere. The Backyard Gang arrives and they introduce themselves through a rap wearing yellow T-shirts with black words for the names, yellow socks, blue shorts, and white shoes.

Then, Michael encourages the audience to join in with a special song. After that, Barney and Tina make farm animal sounds and sing "Down on Grandpa's Farm" with the help of animals in costume. Then, Barney joins the kids to sing "The Noble Duke of York".

Barney and Derek sing "Pop Goes the Weasel" before Barney has help from Michael and Luci to get some Hebrew and French kids on stage to sing "The Alphabet Song" in English, Hebrew, and French.

Then, Luci sings "Where is Thumbkin?", followed by giving Barney a surprise: a camel named Sally.

After that, Barney does the Barney Shake to reveal a special surprise. Just then, the box opens to reveal a green triceratops with a pink bow in her hair, and a yellow blanket. Barney shushes the audience and tells them not to tell the Backyard Gang about the surprise. Then, Barney and the kids sing "Mr. Knickerbocker", but after the song ends, the triceratops comes out of the box again. The kids are surprised to see this and want to know more about the dinosaur. Adam gets an idea to sing the song again after noticing that the dinosaur came out when she heard the song. So they sing the song again, but this time, the dinosaur dances out of the box. After the song, the dinosaur hides behind Barney and gets shy. The kids realize that she doesn't have a name, so they huddle up and think of a name. What gives Amy an idea is seeing the dinosaur's dance moves. So Amy decides to name her Baby Bop, and the other kids agree. Then, Amy decides to have Baby Bop show off some dance moves. Baby Bop dances to some street music, which impresses everyone.

Baby Bop and the Spider performing "The Itsy Bitsy Spider"
Then, Baby Bop gets the confidence to join the show, and she sings "The Itsy Bitsy Spider", and meets a spider puppet. Barney and the kids then sing a bubble bath song with audience participation, but the bath is interrupted by the sound of a firetruck. Baby Bop and some of the kids are dressed as firefighters and they sing "Hurry, Hurry, Drive the Firetruck".

Barney appears as a railroad engineer, and talks about pufferbellies. Then, he sings "Down by the Station". Then, he grabs an American flag, and he is joined by the entire cast to sing "You're a Grand Old Flag".

Then, Barney heads to the front of the stage to tell the audience that the show is about to end. But he does explain that he's always going to be there for everyone. Then, he encourages the audience to hold hands to sing "I Love You". Then, everyone bids farewell to the audience before Barney appears from the curtain and blows them a kiss goodbye, ending the show.

Cast
 Barney (voice) – Bob West
 Barney (body costume) – David Joyner
 Baby Bop (voice) – Julie Johnson
 Baby Bop (body costume) – Dao Knight
 Michael - Brian Eppes
 Amy - Becky Swonke
 Luci - Leah Montes
 Tina - Jessica Zucha
 Adam - Alexander Jhin
 Derek - Rickey Carter

Songs
 "Barney Theme Song" (tune: "Yankee Doodle")
 "Barney Theme Song" (Reprise) (tune: "Yankee Doodle")
 "Everyone is Special"
 "The Backyard Gang Rap"
 "We Are Barney and the Backyard Gang" (tune: "John Jacob Jingleheimer Schmidt")
 "Down on Grandpa's Farm"
 "The Noble Duke of York" (tune: "The Grand Old Duke of York")
 "Pop Goes the Weasel"
 "The Alphabet Song" (English, Hebrew, and French) (tunes: "Baa, Baa, Black Sheep", "Twinkle, Twinkle, Little Star" and "Ah! vous dirai-je, Maman" by Wolfgang Amadeus Mozart)
 "Where is Thumbkin?" (tune: "Frere Jacques")
 "Sally the Camel" (tune: "Dem Bones")
 "Mr. Knickerbocker"
 "Mr. Knickerbocker" (Reprise)
 "Baby Bop's Song" (tune: "Mr. Knickerbocker")
 "Baby Bop's Street Dance"
 "Itsy Bitsy Spider"
 "Bubble, Bubble Bath" (tune: "Peanut Butter")
 "Hurry, Hurry, Drive the Firetruck" (tune: "Ten Little Indians")
 "Down by the Station"
 "You're a Grand Old Flag"
 "I Love You" (tune: "This Old Man")

References

External links
 

American direct-to-video films
1991 television specials
1991 direct-to-video films
1991 films
Barney & Friends
Films set in Dallas
1991 American television episodes
1990s American television specials
Mattel Creations films
1990s English-language films